Dark Arc, premiered in  2004, is the second independent feature film by the writer/director/actor Dan Zukovic.

Reception
Dark Arc premiered at the Montreal World Film Festival in 2004 and was shown at other festivals including Cinequest, The Calgary International Film Festival, The Edmonton International Film Festival, The Quebec City International Film Festival, The Charlotte Film Festival, The Portobello Film Festival, the Nickel Independent Film and Video Festival and the American Cinematheque Festival of Film Noir.

Called "Absolutely brilliant...truly and completely different...something you've never tasted before" by the Film Threat writer Eric Campos, the film was named one of Film Threat's "Indies to look out for in 2006". The  leading actress, Sarah Strange, was nominated for "Best Lead Performance - Female in a Feature Length Drama" at the 2005 BC Film Industry Leo Awards for her role in the film.

In August 2010, the film was released on DVD by Vanguard Cinema.

References

External links

2004 films
Canadian comedy films
2004 comedy films
English-language Canadian films
2000s English-language films
2000s Canadian films